Fueang Nakhon Road is a road in inner Bangkok or Rattanakosin Island. It is located in Phra Nakhon district. It is a short road that is 0.5 km (500 m) long, starting from Si Kak Sao Chingcha  to the south, passes through Wat Ratchabophit and across the Khlong Lot (คลองหลอด, "tube canal") to end at Si Kak Phraya Si, including connects to Ti Thong road by Ratchabophit road at the side of Wat Ratchabophit. 

Fueang Nakhon was built with Western technology during the reign of King Mongkut (Rama IV) in 1863 and completed the following year, shortly after Charoen Krung and Bamrung Mueang roads. The three roads were the first formal roads in Thailand. Thai people call this road "Thanon Khwang" (ถนนขวาง, "impeded road") because it lies across between Charoen Krung and Bamrung Mueang roads. King Mongkut later gave it the name "Fueang Nakhon", which means "prosperous city" or "prosperity of the city". The name rhymes with the names of two other roads.

Fueang Nakhon was longer than in the past. It passed down to the south from Si Kak Sao Chingcha through Chao Por Suea Joss Hose, Wat Mahannapharam, including Democracy Monument on Ratchadamnoen avenue and to the end in front of Wat Bowonniwet in Bang Lamphu area. This phase changed its name to Tanao road.

Around Fueang Nakhon are many historic shophouses built with Sino-Portuguese architecture such as Krung Thai Bank (KTB) branch of the Thanon Fueang Nakhon, which were popular in the reign of King Mongkut.

References 

Phra Nakhon district
Streets in Bangkok

1863 establishments in Siam